Giovanni Battista Salvi da Sassoferrato (August 25, 1609 – August 8, 1685), also known as Giovanni Battista Salvi, was an Italian Baroque painter, known for his archaizing commitment to Raphael's style. He is often referred to only by the town of his birthplace (Sassoferrato), as was customary in his time, and for example seen with da Vinci and Caravaggio.

Biography
The details of Giovanni Battista Salvi's biography are very sparse. He was born in the small town of Sassoferrato in the Marche region of central Italy,  half-way between Rome and Florence, east of Apennines.  

 
Sassoferrato was apprenticed under his father, the painter Tarquinio Salvi; fragments of Tarquinio's work are still visible in the church of Saint Francis in Sassoferrato. The rest of Giovanni's training is undocumented but it is thought that he worked under the Bolognese Domenichino, a main apprentice of Annibale Carracci (c. 1580). Two other Carracci trainees Francesco Albani and  Guido Reni also influenced Sassoferrato. In Francis Russell's view, Reni was as much Sassoferrato's mentor as Domenichino was his master. His paintings also show the influence of Albrecht Dürer, Guercino, and above all Raphael. He appears to also have been influenced by Pierre Mignard, whom he may have met in Rome in the 1630s.

Few public commissions by Sassoferrato exist, and, like Carlo Dolci he seems to have concentrated on producing multiple copies of various styles of devotional image for private patrons, a demand fuelled by the Counter-Reformation of the Catholic Church. Apart from his many smaller works, his paintings include some at the Benedictine convent of San Pietro in Perugia (1630) and the imposing altarpiece in Santa Sabina, Rome, portraying La Madonna del Rosario (1643). In 1683 Cardinal Chigi presented Sassoferrato's self-portrait to Cosimo III de' Medici.

Sassoferrato died in 1685. His will is dated June 29 of the same year.

Works
Sassoferrato's work was held in high regard through to the mid-19th century. His paintings were sometimes believed to be contemporary with the School of Raphael. However, by the late 19th century, reaction against sweet devotional art work was reinforced in England by the critical commentary of John Ruskin.

The late 20th century saw a revival of interest in Italian Baroque archaizing painting with Guido Reni leading the way in generating a surge of auction interest also in Sassoferrato.

There are over three hundred works by Sassoferrato in public collections in 2006 throughout the world including almost all of his extant drawings in the British Royal Collection at Windsor Castle.

Sassoferrato was also active as a copyist and reproduced paintings by other masters. His copying style was highly free and individualistic and he rather modified the original compositions or their dimensions than slavishly copy.

Notes

External links

1609 births
People from the Province of Ancona
17th-century Italian painters
Italian male painters
1685 deaths
Catholic painters